How the World Is Losing Poets is a Czechoslovak comedy film directed by Dušan Klein, based on the novella Amatéři. Jak přichází svět o básníky by Ladislav Pecháček. It was released in 1982. The first of the "Poets hexalogy", the title is followed by How Poets Are Losing Their Illusions (1985), How Poets Are Enjoying Their Lives (1988), Konec básníků v Čechách (1993), Jak básníci neztrácejí naději (2004), and Jak básníci čekají na zázrak (2016).

The film stars Pavel Kříž, David Matásek, and Miroslava Šafránková.

Synopsis
Štepán Šafránek, a high school student with poetic talent, and his friend Kendy, a musician, agree to write and perform a musical play. They rope in various residents of their small town, including Borůvka, a young girl to whom Šafránek ultimately loses his virginity.

Cast and characters
 Pavel Kříž as Štepán Šafránek
 David Matásek as Kendy
 Miroslava Šafránková as Borůvka
 František Filipovský as Valerián
 Josef Somr as Prof. Ječmen
 Oldřich Navrátil as Emil Nádeníček
 Jiří Císler as Čermáček
 Lenka Kořínková as Vránová / wood nymph
 František Ringo Čech as Bouchal
 Míla Myslíková as Šafránková
 Adolf Filip as Kendy's dad
 Lubomír Kostelka as Šindel
 Luděk Kopřiva as Hugo
 Miroslava Hozová as Ječmenová
 Zdena Hadrbolcová as Professor
 Jiří Kodet as Pergl
 Barbora Štepánová as Štepánka Hrdličková
 Jiřina Jirásková as School principal
 Zdeněk Srstka as Bartender (uncredited)

References

External links
 

1982 films
Czechoslovak comedy films
1982 comedy films
Czech comedy films
1980s Czech-language films
1980s Czech films